Matthew 16:19 is the nineteenth verse in sixteenth chapter of the Gospel of Matthew in the New Testament of the Christian Bible. It records the words spoken by Jesus to Simon Peter. It is from this passage that Saint Peter is often said to be the gatekeeper of heaven.

Content
In Koine Greek it reads
δώσω σοι τὰς κλεῖδας τῆς βασιλείας τῶν οὐρανῶν, καὶ ὃ ἐὰν δήσῃς ἐπὶ τῆς γῆς ἔσται δεδεμένον ἐν τοῖς οὐρανοῖς, καὶ ὃ ἐὰν λύσῃς ἐπὶ τῆς γῆς ἔσται λελυμένον ἐν τοῖς οὐρανοῖς.
Dōsō soi tas kleidas tēs Basileias tōn Ouranōn, kai ho ean dēsēs epi tēs Gēs estai dedemenon en tois Ouranois, kai ho ean lysēs epi tēs Gēs estai lelymenon en tois Ouranois.

The exact translation varies slightly depending on the version of the Bible, but it is generally translated into English as: 

"I will give you the keys of the kingdom of heaven; whatever you bind on earth will be bound in heaven, and whatever you loose on earth will be loosed in heaven."

For a collection of other versions see BibleHub Matthew 16:19

Analysis
The Keys of the kingdom and the Kingdom of Heaven are popular Christian concepts and are quite significant in multiple denominations. While the "Kingdom of Heaven" is referenced elsewhere in the Bible, the "Keys of the Kingdom" is only referenced in this passage. "Keys" symbolize "authority" (cf. : "key of the house of David".

The keys of the kingdom is given to Peter, which is explicated to mean that Peter has the authority to bind and loose (cf. Matthew 18:18). This is not to be understood as a statement about exorcism or the forgiveness of sins (cf. John 20:23), but Peter, being a sort of 'supreme rabbi of the kingdom', is given teaching authority, that 'his decisions stand'.

The verbs in future perfect tense—'will have been bound', 'will have been loosed'—suggest that 'the heavenly decision preceded Peter's declaration of it on earth'. "Bind" and "loose" are judicial terms denoting "forbid" and "permit". This expression is to contrast Peter's authority in teaching with that of the Pharisees and the scribes (cf. Matthew 23:13). In  the same authority is given to all of his disciples.

Cultural references
This is a very popular line from the Bible and is referenced in many different forms.

Books
 The adventure-fantasy novel The Keys to the Kingdom
 The 1941 novel The Keys of the Kingdom
 Dostoevsky’s character Ivan references this passage in The Brothers Karamazov while relating a tale about The Inquisition

Music
 Keys of the Kingdom - Moody Blues album
 The Key to the Kingdom (Praga Khan song)
 The songs "Girl in the War" and "Thin Blue Flame" from Josh Ritter's album The Animal Years
 The song "Don't Be Sad" by the band Whiskeytown
 The song "Kingdom of Heaven" by the 13th Floor Elevators
 The song "Kingdom of Heaven" by Epica (band)
 The song "Avalanche" by Matthew Good

Film
 The Keys of the Kingdom (film)
 Kingdom of Heaven (film), a 2005 film directed by Ridley Scott
 Dogma (film), a 1999 American fantasy comedy film written and directed by Kevin Smith

Other
 The Key to the Kingdom - Japanese manga series
 Kingdom of Heaven, the name of a communal religious group led by William W. Davies near Walla Walla, Washington from 1867 to 1881

See also
John 1:42
Primacy of Peter

References

Sources

External links
 

16:19
Heaven in Christianity
Saint Peter